Palaeohierax is an extinct genus of Accipitridae birds from the late Oligocene. One species has been described,  Palaeohierax gervaisii.

References

Accipitridae
Fossil taxa described in 1863
Oligocene birds
Prehistoric bird genera